Heart's Desire is a book by Edward Hoagland, published by Summit Books circa 1988 with the .

In the book's 35 essays, Hoagland offers his observations on a range of topics, including life, love, marriage, children, suffering, the city, and isolation.

Contents

"The Ridge-Slope Fox and the Knife Thrower"
"The Courage of Turtles"
"Home is Two Places"
"Mountain Notch"
"Of Cows and Cambodia"
"Howling Back at the Wolves"
"Lament the Red Wolf"
"Thoughts on Returning to the City After Five Months on a Mountain Where the Wolves Howled"
"City Walking"
"City Rat"
"The Threshold and the Jolt of Pain"
"In the Toils of the Law"
"Virginie and the Slaves"
"Mushpan Man"
"Bears, Bears, Bears"
"Hailing the Elusory Mountain Lion"
"The Moose on the Wall"
"A Run of Bad Luck"
"Heart's Desire"
"The Lapping, Itchy Edge of Love"
"The Problem of the Golden Rule"
"Bragging for Humanity"
"Dogs and the Tug of Life"
"Other Lives"
"The Midnight Train to Portland"
"Fred King and the Allagash"
"Walking the Dead Diamond River"
"The Tugman's Passage"
"A Low-Water Man"
"Heaven and Nature"
"Tiger Bright"
"Dying Argots"
"Two Clowns"
"Should Auld Acquaintance"
"Gods, Masks, and Horses"

References

External links 
 New York Times review

American travel books
Cattle in literature
Wolves in literature
Books about bears
Books about cats
Books about dogs
Books about foxes
Literature featuring anthropomorphic foxes
Summit Books books